Taiping Island Airport is an airport on Taiping Island, Cijin District, Kaohsiung, Taiwan. It is located in the Spratly Islands of the South China Sea. The island (named Itu Aba before 1946) belongs to the Republic of China (Taiwan) since 1956.

Background

Once every two months, a C-130 transport aircraft arrives from Taiwan island which provides personnel transportation and material supplies for the entire island. There are no other regular scheduled flights.

Airlines and destinations

See also
 Dongsha Island Airport (Pratas Island)
 Yongxing Island Airport (Woody Island in the Paracel Islands)
 List of airports in the Spratly Islands
 List of maritime features in the Spratly Islands
 Layang-Layang Airport

References

Airports in Kaohsiung
Airports in the Spratly Islands
2007 establishments in Taiwan